The 1984–85 St. John's Redmen basketball team represented St. John's University during the 1984–85 NCAA Division I men's basketball season. The team was coached by Lou Carnesecca in his seventeenth year at the school. St. John's home games are played at Alumni Hall and Madison Square Garden and the team is a member of the Big East Conference. The team finished 31–4, with three of the four losses coming to Georgetown.

Roster

Schedule and results

|-
!colspan=9 style="background:#FF0000; color:#FFFFFF;"| Non-conference Regular season

|-
!colspan=9 style="background:#FF0000; color:#FFFFFF;"|Big East regular season

|-
!colspan=9 style="background:#FF0000; color:#FFFFFF;"| Big East tournament

|-
!colspan=9 style="background:#FF0000; color:#FFFFFF;"| NCAA Tournament

Rankings

Player statistics

Local Radio

Team players drafted into the NBA

References

St. John's Red Storm men's basketball seasons
St. John's
NCAA Division I men's basketball tournament Final Four seasons
St. John's
St John
St John